Door into Darkness is an Italian television series conceived by Dario Argento.  It consists of four one-hour episodes broadcast in 1973.

Episodes

Reception
In a retrospective review, Troy Howarth in his book on gialli stated that "The Neighbor" was a "pleasant diversion" and "The Tram" was the series highlight. Howarth declared "The Doll" as "sluggish and predictable" while "Eyewitness" a "marked improvement" from "The Doll".

References

Sources

 
 

Italian television series
1970s Italian television series
1973 Italian television series debuts
1973 Italian television series endings
Dario Argento
RAI original programming